USS Nabigwon (YTB-521/YTM-521) was a Hisada-class harbor tug in the service of the United States Navy.  The name "Nabigwon" is taken from a Native American language, meaning "ship".

Nabigwon was assigned advanced base duty in the Pacific.  In addition to towing and berthing services, she provided harbor fire protection and was utilized as an inner harbor patrol craft.
Redesignated YTM in February 1962, Nabigwon remained active as a medium harbor tug at Pearl Harbor into the 1970s.

Nabigwon was sold by the Defense Reutilization and Marketing Service (DRMS) for scrapping on 28 July 1987.

References

External links
Photo gallery at navsource.org

 

Tugs of the United States Navy
Ships built in Jacksonville, Florida
1945 ships